Frank Dudley Perkins (August 1, 1875 – December 31, 1960) was an American football player and coach. He served as the player-coach for the 1894 Texas A&M Aggies football team. He was also a second baseman on the school's baseball team in 1895.

Perkins was born on August 1, 1875, in McKinney, Texas.  He was a businessman and civil leader there before his death on December 31, 1960.

Head coaching record

References

External links
 

1875 births
1960 deaths
American football ends
American football fullbacks
Baseball second basemen
Player-coaches
Texas A&M Aggies football players
Texas A&M Aggies baseball players
Texas A&M Aggies football coaches
People from McKinney, Texas
Players of American football from Texas
Baseball players from Texas